Antsiferovo may refer to:
Antsiferovo, Krasnoyarsk Krai, a village in Krasnoyarsk Krai, Russia
Antsiferovo, Moscow Oblast, a village in Moscow Oblast, Russia
Antsiferovo, Anstiferovskoye Settlement, Khvoyninsky District, Novgorod Oblast, a village (selo) in Antsiferovskoye Settlement of Khvoyninsky District of Novgorod Oblast, Russia
Antsiferovo, Brodskoye Settlement, Khvoyninsky District, Novgorod Oblast, a village in Brodskoye Settlement of Khvoyninsky District of Novgorod Oblast, Russia
Antsiferovo, Tver Oblast, a village in Tver Oblast, Russia
Antsiferovo, name of several other rural localities in Russia